The 2019 UNAF U-20 Tournament is the 12th edition of the UNAF U-20 Tournament. The tournament will take place in Tunisia, from 23 November to 1 December 2019.

Participants

Venues

Squads

Tournament

Matches

Champion

Scorers
4 goals
 Marwan Zarouki

2 goals
 Ibrahim Adel
 Mehdi Mbarek

1 goal

 Khalil Bara
 Mohamed Islam Belkheir
 Ibrahim Diakité
 Osama Faisal
 Arabi Badr
 Mahmoud Saber AbdelMohsen
 Yacine Tamoudi
 Bechir Ghariani
 Achraf Habbassi
 Alaa Ghram
 Chiheb Abidi
 Zied Berrima

Awards
 Golden ball: 
 Golden boot: 
 Golden glove: 
 Fair play trophy:

References

External links
تونس تستضيف دورة منتخبات تحت 20 عاما - UNAF official website

2019 in African football
UNAF U-20 Tournament
UNAF U-20 Tournament